This was the first edition of the tournament.

Marius Copil won the title after defeating Steve Darcis 6–4, 6–2 in the final.

Seeds

Draw

Finals

Top half

Bottom half

References
Main Draw
Qualifying Draw

WHB Hungarian Open - Singles